Samuel Gloade, professionally known as 30 Roc, is an American record producer and songwriter. He is best known for production with notable artists, including Lil Yachty, Migos, Plies, Cardi B, Rich Homie Quan, Kanye West, and Kendrick Lamar, among many others.

Early life
Samuel Gloade was born in the borough of The Bronx in New York City. He met American record producer Mike Will Made It through his rap duo Rae Sremmurd on Twitter. He later signed to the former's record label EarDrummers Records.

Career
His most notable production include T-Wayne's "Nasty Freestyle", "Rake It Up" by Yo Gotti featuring Nicki Minaj, Cardi B's hit single, "Bartier Cardi", which features 21 Savage, "Rock" by Plies, and "King's Dead" which was performed by Jay Rock, Kendrick Lamar, Future and James Blake. 30 Roc also produced Roddy Ricch's number 1 hit, "The Box", which reached the pole position of the Billboard Hot 100 in January 2020. He also helped produce the intro track of Travis Scott's Astroworld, "Stargazing", peaking at number eight on the Hot 100 in 2018. Gloade was also an executive producer for Lil Yachty's second studio album, Lil Boat 2.

Production discography

Charted songs

See also
 EarDrummers Records

References

Living people
Record producers from New York (state)
Year of birth missing (living people)
Musicians from New York City
Musicians from the Bronx
Trap musicians
American rhythm and blues musicians
American hip hop record producers
Songwriters from New York (state)